Ho Man Fai (: 何文輝; born 24 April 1993, in Macau) is a Macanese footballer who plays as a goalkeeper for C.D. Monte Carlo and Macau.

On 30 March 2016, Macau drew 0–0 away to Malaysia. Ho Man Fai was considered the best player on the night as he made several crucial saves to deny the Malaysians.

Ho Man Fai is a member of the Macau national football team that finished second in the 2016 AFC Solidarity Cup.

On 2 December 2019, Ho Man-Fai announced he will travel to Thai League 1 club Chonburi F.C. for a trial and training from 15 December.

References 

Living people
1993 births
Macau footballers
Macau international footballers
Association football goalkeepers
C.D. Monte Carlo players
Liga de Elite players